The Kosovo Police is the national policing law enforcement agency of Kosovo.

History 

A Kosovo Police Service was created in 1999 in the aftermath of the Kosovo War and subsequent withdrawal of the Yugoslav forces from Kosovo. The establishment of the United Nations Interim Administration Mission in Kosovo (UNMIK) included a large international policing component, called the UNMIK Police. They were given two main tasks by UN Security Council Resolution 1244:
To establish a new police force
In the meantime, to maintain civil law and order. 

The name for the new police force was chosen by the first international police commissioner,  Sven Frederiksen.

Recruitment began immediately, and former police school premises in the city of Vushtrria were renovated by the Organization for Security and Co-operation in Europe (OSCE), which began to train cadets.

As of February 2008, when Kosovo declared independence, the force became a governmental agency of the Government of the Republic of Kosovo. Before, it was subordinated to the UNMIK Police, and the police commissioner retained command authority over both the international police and the Kosovo Police.

Size 

The Kosovo Police has grown steadily since 1999, and in 2004 reached its planned full size of nearly 7,000 officers. As of 2010, it has around 9,000 employees. About 90% of Kosovo Police officers are ethnic Albanians while 10% are ethnic minorities, mostly Serbs.

Specialised units and breakdown 

The bulk of the Kosovo Police are patrol officers. However the force has specialised investigative units in all six regions, including Organised Crime Units, Forensics Units, and several others. In addition to those specialist units in the investigative side of law enforcement, every region has a Regional Operational Support Unit (called ROSU), who are trained for times where forced entry is needed on search warrants, as well as acting as front line officers during riot situations, or in times when crowd control is necessary. The Kosovo Police Close Protection unit serves as the body guards for visiting heads of state, and for Kosovo's own political leaders.

Regional Street Crimes Unit / Regional Operational Support Unit 

The first ROSU in Kosovo was for Prishtina and originally called Regional Street Crimes Unit (RSCU) in early 2002, which was created and led by CIVPOL Chief Angel G.Queipo (Florida, United States) and Deputy Chief Jim Renfrow (Arkansas, United States) who implemented undercover operations, narcotics interdiction, medium risk arrest warrants, and special police tactics to include public disorder units within the ranks of the RSCU.  The unit was commanded by CIVPOL Chief Jim Renfrow in the second year and then later Peter Willig of Germany took over after Renfrow ended his CIVPOL mission in late 2003. The creation of the RSCU was under the command of Pristina Regional Commander, Superintendent Paul Hamlin (Northern Ireland) . That unit was based in Kosovo Polje and was used to support all regions as needed. Later due to successes of that unit and additional responsibilities in the team mission to include support of CPU on high risk principals, the name was changed to ROSU (under Chief Jim Renfrow) and duplicate units were placed in each region of Kosovo. The idea was to operate each unit as a separate "troop" with a commander reporting to the mission commander similar to how the State Police operate in the United States. The ROSU is still in use today.

Close Protection Unit 

The Close Protection Unit within the Kosovo Police was established in December 1999.

The main task of the Close Protection Unit is to provide personal protection to VIPs. In addition, the Close Protection Unit provides protection for persons believed to be subject to threats.

The Close Protection Unit also undertakes tactical operations, escorting delegations, and evacuations of both international staff and Kosovo Police officers. The CPU had 150 operators prior to its reorganization and name change. The RSCU or Regional Street Crime Unit was formed in May 2001 and was active for duties (16 Operators were selected among 45 that were on intensive training.)

The Unit was then renamed as ROSU and had around 120 Operators trained for: entry teams, riots, surveillance, special tactics driving, VIP protection, VIP buildings, and government buildings. This Unit is known as a unit that goes first where high risk is the case. The Unit successfully took place in operations along Kosovo's border with Serbia when the crossing was blocked and barricaded by local Serbian civilians and MUP members.

Special Intervention Unit SIU (Former GSI / SIG - FIT) 

This KPS special police unit was created in 2003. The start was a standard SWAT unit (two teams of 15 officers each) trained by two American contractors. In March 2005 the "Special Intervention Group – GSI / SIG" project ("Grupi Special i Intervenimit GSI" in Albanian) was launched on a low-profile bases as the Elite "CT" & "HR" force of Kosovo Police. A strict selection policy was followed through several firm tests; and only 18 trainees were selected among hundreds of willing volunteer officers to be the first generation of the unit.

It was formed, established, equipped, coached and trained by a team of UNMIK professional specialised instructors who worked within that field in their native countries (1) "French GIPN", (1) "Egyptian HRF", (1) "German SEK" and (1) "Bulgarian SP OPS" trainers, in addition to (1) "US CPU" trainer, (1) "Danish PT" coach, and (1) German GSG-9 operator. That experienced team was led firstly by the French "GIPN", then the Egyptian "HRF" Trainer who became the 1st Commander of the GSI. By mid of 2006, due to certain difficulties, the project was converted to a standard "SWAT" police unit level. 

In September 2006 a brand-new project, ordered by head of UNMIK, was prepared, developed and implemented mostly by French Gendarmerie UNMIK contingent members, following their usual rules of action. 
One Senior Officer and 4 specialised NCO's from  PI (Intervention Platoon), 1 US SWAT instructor as specialised shooting trainer and one Turkish Police officer, intended the program of all different specific and very specialised training periods. 
By the end of January 2007, the first group was ready and fully trained. Its first real operation took place - with full success - immediately the day after the official launching presentation. 
The second group was ready in April 2007. These two first groups constituted the new "First Intervention Team" (which name had been chosen by the KPS Police Officers themselves).

In the late 2007 the Unit started its upgrading to face new challenges and ever changing threats. It took the name of SIU,which stands for Specialized Intervention Unit. In late 2008, UNMIK handed the task over to EULEX (European Union Rule of Law mission). The international contribution is currently through the mentoring-monitoring-advising tasks, accompanying the FIT/SIU on the way to full autonomy.

Canine Unit 
The canine unit of the Kosovo Police was established in November 2002. The first canine unit had seven officers. These officers have completed basic training in Great Britain continuing with further trainings with international instructors. In 2000, the canine unit began to operate with five police patrol dogs and five dogs for narcotics detections.

The canine unit performs different police operation with seven police patrol dogs, three dogs for narcotics detections and one for explosives detection. The canine unit has three local instructors who organize training for new recruits to the unit. Instructors were trained in Slovenia, Police Dog Training Center, on the basis of a bilateral agreement. Today they are divided into two groups, one of which operates under the General Police Operations and the other under the Border Police. All together there is more than 20 officers.

Motorcyclists Unit 

The Motorcyclists Unit functions within the Kosovo Police. The first generation of this Unit was established on 29 August 2003 and 7 police officers were trained by the international instructors.

The second generation was trained in the second half of 2003, with 5 police officers, while the third generation with 9 police officers was trained in 2004. In 2005, a fourth generation of twelve police officers was trained, while currently the Motorcycles Unit has 32 police officers.

The main responsibility of the Motorcyclists Unit is to escort Very Important Persons (VIPs).

Interpol membership
In November 2018 Kosovo's police was denied membership in Interpol, the international organization that facilitates international police cooperation. Kosovo accused Serbia of being behind the negative vote and retaliated against Serbia with 100% tariffs over goods imported from their northern neighbor country.

Firearms

Insignia

Current

Historic

See also 

 Kosovo Bomb Squad (IED/EOD)
 Kosovo Protection Corps
 Kosovo Security Force
 Kosovo Force (KFOR)
 Triumf Riza
Crime
 Crime in Kosovo

Notes and references

Explanatory notes

References

External links 
 Kosovo Police Official Website
 Ministry of Internal Affairs
 Kosovo Center for Public Safety, Education and Development
 Special units of Kosovo Police – ROSU

Law enforcement in Kosovo
Government agencies established in 1999
1999 establishments in Kosovo